Timothy Thomas Ryan (July 5, 1899 – October 22, 1956) was an American performer and film actor. His wife, Irene Ryan, who later played Granny on The Beverly Hillbillies, and he were a show-business team who performed on Broadway, in films,  and on radio. They made short films for Educational Pictures in the mid-1930s based on their vaudeville act.

They were married from 1922 to 1942. Even after their divorce in 1942, the couple occasionally worked together. In the 1940s, Ryan found opportunities at Monogram Pictures, where he acted in films and wrote screenplays. In films of the 1940s and the early 1950s, Ryan appeared onscreen playing numerous roles as policemen, newspaper editors, and detectives.

He was born in Bayonne, New Jersey, to Edward and Hannah (McGeehan) Ryan, and died in Los Angeles at the age of 57.

Selected filmography

 Brother Orchid (1940) - Turkey Malone
 Private Affairs (1940) - Bartender Harry
 Third Finger, Left Hand (1940) - Third Mate on Ship (uncredited)
 I'm Nobody's Sweetheart Now (1940) - Judge Saunders
 Hullabaloo (1940) - Skee Golf Concessionaire (uncredited)
 Where Did You Get That Girl? (1941) - Police Inspector
 Lucky Devils (1941) - K.W. Momsen
 Maisie Was a Lady (1941) - Second Barker (uncredited)
 The Strawberry Blonde (1941) - Streetcleaner Foreman (uncredited)
 A Man Betrayed (1941) - Mr. Wilson, Insurance Agent
 The Penalty (1941) - Police Sergeant (uncredited)
 Dead Men Tell (1941) - Red Eye Bartender (uncredited)
 Pot o' Gold (1941) - Snooky (uncredited)
 Sis Hopkins (1941) - Police Sergeant (uncredited)
 Angels with Broken Wings (1941) - (uncredited)
 San Antonio Rose (1941) - Gus (uncredited)
 Sweetheart of the Campus (1941) - Football Coach (uncredited)
 Hurricane Smith (1941) - Bartender (uncredited)
 Citadel of Crime (1941) - Minor Role (uncredited)
 Ice-Capades (1941) - Jackson
 Dr. Kildare's Wedding Day (1941) - Piano Mover (uncredited)
 Harmon of Michigan (1941) - Flash Regan
 Two Latins from Manhattan (1941) - Police Sergeant
 You'll Never Get Rich (1941) - Cop ticketing Curtis (uncredited)
 It Started with Eve (1941) - Tom - Assistant Editor (uncredited)
 Last of the Duanes (1941) - Bartender (uncredited)
 Three Girls About Town (1941) - Singing Drunk
 Public Enemies (1941) - Trumbull
 I Wake Up Screaming (1941) - Detective (uncredited)
 The Devil Pays Off (1941) - First Mate (uncredited)
 Rise and Shine (1941) - Doorman (uncredited)
 Melody Lane (1941) - Police Sergeant
 Bedtime Story (1941) - Mac
 Ball of Fire (1941) - Motor Cop
 Don't Get Personal (1942) - Traffic Cop
 Blue, White and Perfect (1942) - Barney - Cop (uncredited)
 Blondie Goes to College (1942) - Mr. Higby, Football Coach (uncredited)
 Nazi Agent (1942) - Officer (uncredited)
 Mr. and Mrs. North (1942) - O'Toole the Fingerprint Man (uncredited)
 Pardon My Stripes (1942) - Speed Wilson (uncredited)
 A Tragedy at Midnight (1942) - Police Commissioner (uncredited)
 Yokel Boy (1942) - Waiter (uncredited)
 Secret Agent of Japan (1942) - Bartender (uncredited)
 Butch Minds the Baby (1942) - Mike (uncredited)
 The Courtship of Andy Hardy (1942) - Police Officer Farrell (uncredited)
 This Time for Keeps (1942) - Professor Diz (uncredited)
 This Gun for Hire (1942) - Weems - Guard (uncredited)
 Sweetheart of the Fleet (1942) - Gordon Crouse
 Tortilla Flat (1942) - Rupert Hogan (uncredited)
 Flight Lieutenant (1942) - Bartender (uncredited)
 Just Off Broadway (1942) - Bus Tour Guide (uncredited)
 The Man in the Trunk (1942) - Auctioneer
 Get Hep to Love (1942) - Detective Tucker
 The Forest Rangers (1942) - Keystone Cop (uncredited)
 Stand By All Networks (1942) - Police Inspector Ryan
 Strictly in the Groove (1942) - Professor Blake
 Stand by for Action (1942) - Lt. Tim Ryan
 Reveille with Beverly (1943) - Mr. Kennedy
 Two Weeks to Live (1943) - Thrill-a-Minute Higgens (uncredited)
 Hit Parade of 1943 (1943) - Brownie May
 Redhead from Manhattan (1943) - Mike Glendon
 Sarong Girl (1943) - Tim Raynor
 Melody Parade (1943) - Happy Harrington
 Mystery of the 13th Guest (1943) - Police Lt. Burke
 Riding High (1943) - Jones (uncredited)
 The Sultan's Daughter (1943) - Tim
 Swingtime Johnny (1943) - Sparks
 Swing Out the Blues (1943) - Judge Dudley Gordon
 True to Life (1943) - Mr. Mammal (uncredited)
 Her Primitive Man (1944) - House Detective (uncredited)
 Hot Rhythm (1944) - Mr. O'Hara
 And the Angels Sing (1944) - Stage-Door Man (uncredited)
 Detective Kitty O'Day (1944) - Inspector Clancy
 Kansas City Kitty (1944) - Dave Clark
 Shadow of Suspicion (1944) - Everett G. Northrup
 Crazy Knights (1944) - Grogan
 Hi, Beautiful (1944) - Babcock
 Adventures of Kitty O'Day (1945) - Inspector Clancy
 Fashion Model (1945) - Police Inspector O'Hara
 Rockin' in the Rockies (1945) - Tom Trove
 Swingin' on a Rainbow (1945) - Hustun Greer
 Detour (1945) - Nevada Diner Proprietor
 Who's Guilty? (1945) - Duke Ellis
 Idea Girl (1946) - Ken Williams (uncredited)
 Two Sisters from Boston (1946) - Mr. Dibson (uncredited)
 Dark Alibi (1946) - Foggy 
 Till the End of Time (1946) - Steve Sumpter (uncredited)
 Wife Wanted (1946) - Bartender
 Bringing Up Father (1946) - Dinty Moore
 Blondie's Holiday (1947) - Mike
 High Barbaree (1947) - Ringmaster (uncredited)
 News Hounds (1947) - editor John 'Bullfrog' Burke
 The Unfinished Dance (1947) - Moose (uncredited)
 Merton of the Movies (1947) - Mammoth Studio's Night guard (uncredited)
 Cass Timberlane (1947) - Police Officer Charlie Ellis (uncredited)
 Body and Soul (1947) - Jack Shelton (uncredited)
 Jiggs and Maggie in Society (1947) - Dinty Moore
 Half Past Midnight (1948) - Amos the Bartender (uncredited)
 Shanghai Chest (1948) - Police Lt. Mike Ruark
 Beyond Glory (1948) - Partier Punched by Rocky (uncredited)
 The Golden Eye (1948) - Lt. Mike Ruark, aka "Vincent O'Brien"
 The Luck of the Irish (1948) - Patrolman Clancy (uncredited)
 Jiggs and Maggie in Court (1948) - Dinty Moore
 Force of Evil (1948) - Johnson (uncredited)
 Miss Mink of 1949 (1949) - Police Sgt. Clancy (uncredited)
 Shamrock Hill  (1949)  - Uncle
 Alias Nick Beal (1949) - Detective Dodds (uncredited)
 Champion (1949) - Al - Kansas City Manager (uncredited)
 The Stratton Story (1949) - Man Playing Slot Machine (uncredited)
 Sky Dragon (1949) - Lt. Mike Ruark 
 Stampede (1949) - The Drunk (uncredited)
 Forgotten Women (1949) - Harry
 Jiggs and Maggie in Jackpot Jitters (1949) - Dinty Moore
 Red, Hot and Blue (1949) - Brad Williams - Stranger (uncredited)
 Dear Wife (1949) - Police Officer Simmons (uncredited)
 Jiggs and Maggie Out West (1950) - Dinty Moore
 Military Academy with That Tenth Avenue Gang (1950) - Specs' Father (uncredited)
 The Asphalt Jungle (1950) - Jack, police clerk (uncredited)
 Joe Palooka in Humphrey Takes a Chance (1950) - Bentley
 The Petty Girl (1950) - Durkee - Producer #1 (uncredited)
 My Blue Heaven (1950) - Cop (uncredited)
 To Please a Lady (1950) - Minor Role (uncredited)
 Cuban Fireball (1951) - Detective Bacon
 All That I Have (1951) - Ben Renson
 Crazy Over Horses (1951) - Flynn
 Here Come the Marines (1952) - Sheriff Benson
 Fargo (1952) - Sam
 No Holds Barred (1952) - Mr. Hunter
 The Marksman (1953) - Stagecoach Driver
 From Here to Eternity (1953) - Sergeant Pete Karelsen
 Hot News (1953) -  Ringside Fight Announcer (uncredited)
 Private Eyes (1953) - Andy the Cop
 Fighting Trouble (1956) - Ray Vance
 The Cruel Tower (1956) - Bartender (uncredited)
 The Buster Keaton Story (1957) - Studio Policeman
 Beau James (1957) - Captain of Police (uncredited) (final film role)

References

External links
 

1890s births
1956 deaths
American male film actors
American male radio actors
American male musical theatre actors
Vaudeville performers
Male actors from New Jersey
20th-century American male actors
20th-century American male singers
20th-century American singers